Yuzimanovo (Yöźimän) is a rural locality (a village) in Saitbabinsky Selsoviet, Gafuriysky District, Bashkortostan, Russia. The population was 317 as of 2010. There are 4 streets.

Geography 
Yuzimanovo is located 43 km northeast of Krasnousolsky (the district's administrative centre) by road. Imyannik is the nearest rural locality.

References 

Rural localities in Gafuriysky District